Haplostola is a monotypic moth genus of the family Noctuidae. Its only species, Haplostola aphelioides, is found in Puerto Rico. Both the genus and species were first described by Heinrich Benno Möschler in 1890.

References

Acontiinae
Monotypic moth genera